The Samson Option (b'rerat shimshon) is the name that some military analysts and authors have given to Israel's deterrence strategy of massive retaliation with nuclear weapons as a "last resort" against a country whose military has invaded and/or destroyed much of Israel. Commentators also have employed the term to refer to situations where non-nuclear, non-Israeli actors have threatened conventional weapons retaliation, such as Yasser Arafat.

The name is a reference to the biblical Israelite judge Samson who pushed apart the pillars of a Philistine temple, bringing down the roof and killing himself and thousands of Philistines who had captured him, crying out "Let me die with the Philistines!" (Judges 16:30).

Nuclear ambiguity
Israel refuses to confirm or deny it has nuclear weapons or to describe how it would use them, an official policy of nuclear ambiguity, also known as "nuclear opacity." This has made it difficult for anyone outside the Israeli government to describe the country's true nuclear policy definitively, while still allowing Israel to influence the perceptions, strategies and actions of other governments. However, over the years, some Israeli leaders have publicly acknowledged their country's nuclear capability: Ephraim Katzir in 1974, Moshe Dayan in 1981, Shimon Peres in 1998, and Ehud Olmert in 2006.

During his 2006 confirmation hearings before the United States Senate regarding his appointment as George W. Bush's Secretary of Defense, Robert Gates admitted that Israel had nuclear weapons, and two years later, in 2008, former US president Jimmy Carter stated the number of nuclear weapons held by Israel to be "150 or more".

In his 2008 book The Culture of War, Martin van Creveld, a professor of military history at Israel's Hebrew University, wrote that since Gates admitted that Israel had nuclear weapons, any talk of Israel's nuclear weapons in Israel can lead to "arrest, trial, and imprisonment." Thus Israeli commentators talk in euphemisms such as "doomsday weapons" and the Samson Option.

Nevertheless, as early as 1976, the CIA believed that Israel possessed 10 to 20 nuclear weapons.  By 2002, it was estimated that the number had increased to between 75 and 200 thermonuclear weapons, each in the multiple-megaton range. Kenneth S. Brower has estimated as many as 400 nuclear weapons.  These can be launched from land, sea and air. This gives Israel a second strike option even if much of the country is destroyed.

In 1991, American investigative journalist and  Pulitzer Prize winning political writer Seymour Hersh authored the book Samson Option: Israel's Nuclear Arsenal & American Foreign Policy. In the preface of the book he writes: "This is a book about how Israel became a nuclear power in secret. It also tells how that secret was shared, sanctioned, and, at times, willfully ignored by the top political and military officials of the United States since the Eisenhower years."

Deterrence doctrine

Although nuclear weapons were viewed as the ultimate guarantor of Israeli security, as early as the 1960s, the country avoided building its military around them, instead pursuing absolute conventional superiority so as to forestall a last resort nuclear engagement. The original conception of the Samson Option was only as deterrence. According to United States journalist Seymour Hersh and Israeli historian Avner Cohen, Israeli leaders like David Ben-Gurion, Shimon Peres, Levi Eshkol and Moshe Dayan coined the phrase in the mid-1960s. They named it after the biblical figure Samson, who pushed apart the pillars of a Philistine temple, bringing down the roof and killing himself and thousands of Philistines who had captured him, mutilated him, and gathered to see him further humiliated in chains as retribution for his massacres of their people. They contrasted it with ancient siege of Masada where 936 Jewish Sicarii committed mass suicide rather than be defeated and enslaved by the Romans.

In what they called the "Last Secret of the Six-Day War" the New York Times reported that in the days before the 1967 Six-Day War Israel planned to insert a team of paratroopers by helicopter into the Sinai. Their mission was to set up and remote detonate a nuclear bomb on a mountaintop as a warning to belligerent surrounding states.  The greatly outnumbered Jewish state in a surprising turn of events effectively eliminated the Egyptian Air Force and occupied the Sinai winning the war before the test could even be set up. Retired Israeli brigadier general Itzhak Yaakov referred to this operation as the Israeli Samson Option.

In the 1973 Yom Kippur War, Arab forces were overwhelming Israeli forces and Prime Minister Golda Meir authorized a nuclear alert and ordered 13 atomic bombs be readied for use by missiles and aircraft. The Israeli Ambassador informed President Nixon that "very serious conclusions" may occur if the United States did not airlift supplies. Nixon complied. This is seen by some commentators on the subject as the first threat of the use of the Samson Option.

Seymour Hersh writes that the "surprising victory of Menachem Begin's Likud Party in the May 1977 national elections ... brought to power a government that was even more committed than Labor to the Samson Option and the necessity of an Israeli nuclear arsenal."

Louis René Beres, a professor of political science at Purdue University, chaired Project Daniel, a group advising Prime Minister Ariel Sharon.  He argues in the Final Report of Project Daniel and elsewhere that the effective deterrence of the Samson Option would be increased by ending the policy of nuclear ambiguity. In a 2004 article he recommends Israel use the Samson Option threat to "support conventional preemptions" against enemy nuclear and non-nuclear assets because "without such weapons, Israel, having to rely entirely upon non-nuclear forces, might not be able to deter enemy retaliations for the Israeli preemptive strike."

Authors' opinions 
Israeli reporter Ari Shavit writes of Israel's nuclear strategy: "Concerning anything and everything nuclear, Israel would be much, much more cautious than the United States and NATO. Concerning anything and everything nuclear, Israel would be the responsible adult of the international community. It would well understand the formidable nature of the demon and keep it locked in the basement".

Some have written about the "Samson Option" as a retaliation strategy. In 2002, the Los Angeles Times published an opinion piece by Louisiana State University professor David Perlmutter which the American Jewish author Ron Rosenbaum writes "goes so far as to justify" a Samson Option approach:

Rosenbaum writes in his 2012 book How the End Begins: The Road to a Nuclear World War III that, in his opinion, in the "aftermath of a second Holocaust", Israel could "bring down the pillars of the world (attack Moscow and European capitals for instance)" as well as the "holy places of Islam." He writes that "abandonment of proportionality is the essence" of the Samson Option.

In 2003, a military historian, Martin van Creveld, thought that the Al-Aqsa Intifada then in progress threatened Israel's existence. Van Creveld was quoted in David Hirst's The Gun and the Olive Branch (2003) as saying:

However, according to Brig. Gen. Yitzhak Yaakov, who was the mastermind behind the "Samson Option", it was unlikely Israel could have even targeted Europe, as Israel did not yet have other measures like bombs or missiles to carry the nuclear payload.

In 2012, in response to Günter Grass's poem "Was gesagt werden muss" ("What Must Be Said") which criticized Israel's nuclear weapons program, Israeli poet and Holocaust survivor Itamar Yaoz-Kest published a poem entitled "The Right to Exist: a Poem-Letter to the German Author" which addresses Grass by name. It contains the line: "If you force us yet again to descend from the face of the Earth to the depths of the Earth — let the Earth roll toward the Nothingness."  Jerusalem Post journalist Gil Ronen saw this poem as referring to the Samson Option, which he described as the strategy of using Israel's nuclear weapons, "taking out Israel's enemies with it, possibly causing irreparable damage to the entire world."

See also
 Dahiya doctrine
 Israel and weapons of mass destruction
 Massive retaliation
 Mutual assured destruction
 No first use
 Nuclear weapons and Israel
 Pre-emptive nuclear strike
 Preventive war
 Project Daniel

References

Bibliography
 .
 .
 .

External links
Louis René Beres, Israel and Samson. Biblical Insights on Israeli Strategy in the Nuclear Age , JerusalemSummit.Org.
Ross Dunn, Sharon eyes 'Samson option' against Iraq, Scotsman.Com news, November 3, 2002.
Ross Dunn, In war, Israel retains the Samson option, Sydney Morning Herald, September 20, 2002.
David Hirst, The War Game, a controversial view of the current crisis in the Middle East, The Observer Guardian, September 21, 2003.
 .

Foreign relations of Israel
Israeli nuclear development
Arab–Israeli conflict
Nuclear strategy

he:מדיניות הגרעין של ישראל#מדיניות השימוש בנשק הגרעיני